Journey to the Unknown is a 1970 British-American made-for-television thriller film featuring two episodes derived from the 1968–1969 anthology television series of the same name starring Vera Miles and Patty Duke, directed by Michael Lindsay-Hogg and Don Chaffey. The film contains the following episodes:
 
"Matakitas is Coming" (original broadcast: November 28, 1968 on ABC)
"The Last Visitor" (original broadcast: January 2, 1969 on ABC)

Joan Crawford is featured as hostess in a dark library setting who provides a short narration and introduces the two episodes.

Plot

"Matakitas is Coming"
Director: Michael Lindsay-Hogg
Written by: Robert Heverley
Cast: Vera Miles (June Wiley), Leon Lissek (Andros Matakitas), Gay Hamilton (Sylvia Ann), Lyn Pinkney (Tracy), Dermot Walsh (Ken), John Junkin (Robert)

June Wiley is a criminologist doing research on a dead 1920s mad serial killer named Andros Matakitas who finds herself alone and trapped inside a deserted library where, 41 years earlier, he killed the librarian.

"The Last Visitor"
Director: Don Chaffey
Written by: Alfred Shaughnessy
Cast: Patty Duke (Barbara King), Kay Walsh (Mrs. Walker), Geoffrey Bayldon (Mr. Plimmer), Joan Newell (Mrs. Plimmer), Blake Butler (Butler), John Bailey (Mitchell), Michael Craze (Fred), Sally James (Peggy)

A young woman on holiday at a seaside resort hotel is stalked by a mysterious prowler which Mrs. Walker (Kay Walsh), the proprietress of the resort, informs her is her estranged, psychotic husband.

References

External links

1970 television films
1970 films
1970 horror films
British television films
British anthology films
British horror anthology films
1970s English-language films
Hammer Film Productions films
20th Century Fox Television films
Films edited from television programs
Films directed by Michael Lindsay-Hogg
Films directed by Don Chaffey
1970s British films